Betacoronavirus (β-CoVs or Beta-CoVs) is one of four genera  (Alpha-, Beta-, Gamma-, and Delta-) of coronaviruses. Member viruses are enveloped, positive-strand RNA viruses that infect mammals (of which humans are part). The natural reservoir for betacoronaviruses are bats and rodents. Rodents are the reservoir for the subgenus Embecovirus, while bats are the reservoir for the other subgenera.

The coronavirus genera are each composed of varying viral lineages with the betacoronavirus genus containing four such lineages: A, B, C, D. In older literature, this genus is also known as "group 2 coronaviruses". The genus is in the subfamily Orthocoronavirinae in the family Coronaviridae, of the order Nidovirales.

The betacoronaviruses of the greatest clinical importance concerning humans are OC43 and HKU1 (which can cause the common cold) of lineage A, SARS-CoV and SARS-CoV-2 (which has caused the disease COVID-19) of lineage B, and MERS-CoV of lineage C. MERS-CoV is the first betacoronavirus belonging to lineage C that is known to infect humans.

Etymology
The name "betacoronavirus" is derived from Ancient Greek βῆτα (bē̂ta, "the second letter of the Greek alphabet"), and κορώνη (korṓnē, “garland, wreath”), meaning crown, which describes the appearance of the surface projections seen under electron microscopy that resemble a solar corona. This morphology is created by the viral spike (S) peplomers, which are proteins that populate the surface of the virus and determine host tropism. The order Nidovirales is named for the Latin nidus, which means 'nest'. It refers to this order's production of a 3′-coterminal nested set of subgenomic mRNAs during infection.

Structure 

Several structures of the spike proteins have been resolved. The spike protein, a type 1 fusion machine, assembles into a trimer; its core structure resembles that of paramyxovirus F (fusion) proteins. The receptor usage is not very conserved; for example, among Sarbecovirus, only a sub-lineage containing SARS share the ACE2 receptor.

The viruses of subgenera Embecovirus differ from all others in the genus in that they have an additional shorter (8 nm) spike-like protein called hemagglutinin esterase (HE). It is believed to have been acquired from influenza C virus.

Genome

Coronaviruses have a large genome size that ranges from 26 to 32 kilobases. The overall structure of β-CoV genome is similar to that of other CoVs, with an ORF1ab replicase polyprotein (rep, pp1ab) preceding other elements. This polyprotein is cleaved into 16 nonstructural proteins (see UniProt annotation of SARS rep).

As of May 2013, GenBank has 46 published complete genomes of the α- (group 1), β- (group 2), γ- (group 3), and δ- (group 4) CoVs.

Recombination
Genetic recombination can occur when two or more viral genomes are present in the same host cell. The dromedary camel Beta-CoV HKU23 exhibits genetic diversity in the African camel population.  Contributing to this diversity are several  recombination events that had taken place in the past between closely related betacoronaviruses of the subgenus Embecovirus.  Also the betacoronavirus, Human SARS-CoV, appears to have had a complex history of recombination between ancestral coronaviruses that were hosted in several different animal groups.

Pathogenesis

Alpha- and betacoronaviruses mainly infect bats, but they also infect other species like humans, camels, and rodents. Betacoronaviruses that have caused epidemics in humans generally induce fever and respiratory symptoms. They include:

 SARS-CoV, causing SARS.
 MERS-CoV, causing MERS.
 SARS-CoV-2, causing COVID-19.

Classification

Within the genus Betacoronavirus (Group 2 CoV), four subgenera or lineages (A, B, C, and D) have traditionally been recognized. The four lineages have also been named using Greek letters or numerically. A fifth subgenus, Hibecovirus, was added more recently. Member subgenera and species include:

Embecovirus (lineage A)

Betacoronavirus 1
Bovine coronavirus
Human coronavirus OC43
China Rattus coronavirus HKU24
Human coronavirus HKU1
Murine coronavirus
Mouse hepatitis virus
Myodes coronavirus 2JL14

Sarbecovirus (lineage B)

Severe acute respiratory syndrome–related coronavirus (SARSr-CoV or SARS-CoV)
Severe acute respiratory syndrome coronavirus (SARS-CoV or SARS-CoV-1)
Severe acute respiratory syndrome coronavirus 2 (SARS-CoV-2)
Bat SARS-like coronavirus WIV1 (Bat SL-CoV-WIV1)
Bat coronavirus RaTG13

Merbecovirus (lineage C)

Hedgehog coronavirus 1
Middle East respiratory syndrome-related coronavirus (MERS-CoV)
Pipistrellus bat coronavirus HKU5
Tylonycteris bat coronavirus HKU4

Nobecovirus (lineage D)

Eidolon bat coronavirus C704
Rousettus bat coronavirus GCCDC1
Rousettus bat coronavirus HKU9

Hibecovirus

Bat Hp-betacoronavirus Zhejiang2013

See also
 Animal viruses

References

External links
 Coronaviruses
 Viralzone: Betacoronavirus
 Virus Pathogen Database and Analysis Resource (ViPR): Coronaviridae

 
Virus genera
Coronaviruses